The Sandman Universe is a line of American comic books published by DC Comics under its imprints DC Vertigo and DC Black Label. The line launched to celebrate the 30th anniversary of Neil Gaiman's The Sandman (1989–1996) and Vertigo's 25th anniversary. The Sandman Universe began in August 2018, with a titular one-shot, which was followed by four ongoing series—House of Whispers, Lucifer, Books of Magic, and The Dreaming. Each comic is overseen by Gaiman but written by new creative teams.

Conception and development
The Sandman Universe celebrates the 30th anniversary of DC Comics' The Sandman and the 25th anniversary of the launch of the DC Vertigo imprint. The line was conceived and is overseen by the series' creator, Neil Gaiman, but produced by new creative teams. The Sandman Universe expands The Sandmans part of the DC Universe using new characters and concepts. The line was announced by Entertainment Weekly in March 2018 and was accompanied by a trailer featuring Gaiman. It launched with the one-shot The Sandman Universe #1 on August 8, 2018, with the other series following on later dates.

When asked why he returned to The Sandman, Gaiman said he began to feel guilty that almost no one had been able to return to the series since its conclusion and liked the idea of reviving it, as well as letting new writers play with his "toys". Gaiman assembled the writing team for the line with the Vertigo editorial team. Both parties suggested writers who they thought would be good for new Sandman stories. Samples by writers were then read by Gaiman, who decided whether or not they were proficient. Choosing writers also involved deciding which comic suited which writer best. Gaiman cited Nalo Hopkinson's science fiction work as an influence for assigning her to House of Whispers. Gaiman chose Kat Howard, who he has worked with for several years, to reboot The Books of Magic because of her handling of magic in her stories, and Dan Watters to write Lucifer because he was up to the challenge of recreating the character.

Titles
The Sandman Universe began with a titular one-shot released in August 2018. It picks up after the events of DC's 2017–2018 Dark Nights: Metal crossover event. Dream has disappeared since the conclusion of Metal, leading to chaos in his homeland of the Dreaming. Each Sandman Universe series follows a story thread introduced in the one-shot.

Collected editions

Reception
According to the review aggregator Comic Book Roundup, the line has an average rating of 8.9/10 based on 20 reviews.

References

Further reading

External links
 Official press release from DC Comics

Neil Gaiman
The Sandman (comic book)
Vertigo Comics titles
Gothic comics